Bengkayang Regency is a regency ("kabupaten") in West Kalimantan Province of Indonesia, (on the island of Borneo). The area was originally a part of Sambas Regency, but following the expansion of the population in that area, Sambas Regency was divided into a smaller Sambas Regency and a new Bengkayang Regency in 1999, and then Singkawang City was subsequently cut out of Bengkayang Regency in 2001. The regency now covers an area of 5,396.30 km2, and had a population of 215,277 at the 2010 Census and 286,366 at the 2020 Census; the official estimate as at mid 2021 was 290,943. The administrative centre is in the town of Bengkayang.

Bengkayang is in northern West Kalimantan, sharing a border with Sarawak in Malaysia. With arable land and favourable relief, the agricultural sector is the main economic source. Bengkayang is also rich in natural resources.

Bengkayang is still lagging in term of economic development, but there is a hope that providing local autonomy will catalyze development. A water processing plant has been developed, so the population can enjoy access to clean water.

Administrative districts
The regency is divided into seventeen districts (kecamatan), tabulated below with their areas and their populations at the 2010 Census and the 2020 Census, together with the official estimates as at mid 2021. The table also includes the locations of the district administrative centres, the number of administrative villages (rural desa and urban kelurahan) in each district and its post code.

Note: (a) includes coastal part of mainland Kalimantan as well as 12 offshore islands.

List of Bengkayang Regents and Vice Regents

Climate
Bengkayang has a tropical rainforest climate (Af) with heavy rainfall year-round.

References 

Regencies of West Kalimantan